Now We Can See is the fourth album from the Portland-based indie rock band The Thermals. The album was released on April 7, 2009 on Kill Rock Stars, which is their first album since switching labels from Sub Pop Records. Lead singer Hutch Harris claimed the album hinges on a leitmotif of "songs from when we were alive".

The first single from the album was the title track, "Now We Can See". It premiered at Pitchfork Media on February 10, 2009.

"Now We Can See" was featured in the second season finale of the NBC dramedy Chuck.

Reception

The album holds a score of 79 out of 100 from Metacritic based on "generally favorable reviews".

Track listing

The official track-listing was revealed on their label, Kill Rock Stars' website:

Personnel
 Kathy Foster - drums, bass, vocals, piano, noise
 Hutch Harris - guitar, vocals

Charts

References

The Thermals albums
2009 albums
Kill Rock Stars albums
Albums produced by John Congleton